"One" is Crystal Kay's 24th single, it was released on July 16, 2008. On March 3, 2008, it was revealed that Kay was chosen to sing the theme song to the eleventh Pokémon film Giratina and the Sky Warrior. Kay also played the voice of Nurse Joy's Chansey in the film. The film's producers had apparently been considering the singer since 2001, when she sang "Lost Child" with Shinichi Osawa and Hiroshi Fujiwara for the soundtrack of the drama Satorare. The film was released in Japan on July 19, three days after the release of the single.

Track listing 
Regular edition

Pokémon edition

Charts

References

External links 
 Official website

2008 singles
2008 songs
Crystal Kay songs
Epic Records singles
Japanese film songs
Songs written for animated films
Song articles with missing songwriters